Emily Litella is a fictional character created and performed by comedian Gilda Radner in a series of appearances on Saturday Night Live.  Based on a person in her early life, Emily Litella was a popular character in Radner's comedy repertoire.

Premise
Emily Litella is an elderly woman with a hearing problem who appeared 26 times on SNL's Weekend Update op-ed segment between November 15, 1975 (Season 1) and December 17, 1977 (Season 3). Attired in a frumpy dress, sweater and Lisa Loopner eyeglasses, Litella was introduced with professional dignity by the news anchors, who could sometimes be seen cringing slightly in anticipation of the malapropisms they knew would follow. These sketches were, in part, a parody of the Fairness Doctrine, which at the time required broadcasters in the United States to present opposing viewpoints on public issues.

Litella would peer through her reading glasses and, in the character's high-pitched, warbly voice, would read a prepared statement in opposition to an editorial that the TV station had supposedly broadcast. Litella would become increasingly agitated as her statement progressed. Midway in her commentary, it became apparent to the anchor and the audience that Litella had misheard or misunderstood the subject of the editorial to which she was responding. A typical example:

The news anchor would  interrupt Litella to point out her error, along the lines, "That's death penalty, Ms. Litella, not deaf ... death." Litella would wrinkle her nose, say something like, "Oh, that's very different," then meekly turn to the camera and say, smiling, "Never mind!"

When Litella played against news anchor Chevy Chase (whom she often called "Cheddar Cheese"), he would be somewhat sympathetic to her. But when Jane Curtin took over the anchor role, she would scold Litella, "Every week you come on and you get it wrong," to which Litella would reply, "Bitch!"

Appearances

History
Radner based Litella on her childhood nanny, Elizabeth Clementine Gillies, known as "Dibby", who was allegedly hard of hearing.
The running gag "Never mind" became a lighthearted catchphrase of the era.

In her first appearance on SNL, the character of Emily Litella was an author who appeared as an interview subject on a show called "Looks At Books".  Though she had the same wavery voice and somewhat frumpy wardrobe as she would in later episodes, Litella did not appear to have a hearing problem in this appearance.  All but one of the subsequent SNL appearances by Litella were at the newsdesk, and featured the by-now much more familiar "editorial reply" iteration of the character. In the eleventh episode of season four, on February 10, 1979, with guest hostess Cicely Tyson, the final comedy sketch was called "Emily Litellavision", and featured Litella hosting a staging of a song from Porky and Bess, her Porky Pig-based mis-hearing of Porgy and Bess by George and Ira Gershwin and DuBose Heyward, with Garrett Morris singing a song to Tyson with added stuttering, and the orchestra shown wearing pig masks.

Outside of Saturday Night Live, Radner played the character briefly on The Muppet Show.  At the top of that episode, Miss Litella is discovered backstage by stage manager Scooter, where she is vociferously complaining about the indignity of her appearing in something so silly as "The Muffin Show", whereupon Scooter gently persuades Miss Litella that she would be appearing on "The Muppet Show", not "The Muffin Show". After hearing this reassurance, she withdraws her objection, and meekly apologizes to Scooter by saying, "Never mind."

The character also appeared in Radner's 1979 one-woman off-Broadway show, Gilda Live, in which  Litella took a job as a substitute teacher in Bedford-Stuyvesant, replacing a teacher who had been a victim of a stabbing by one of his students, which put him in the hospital. Miss Litella further cautioned her new students to be very careful where they put their toes, as the regular teacher's "stubbing" was the third such "stubbing", as Miss Litella put it, at the school that week alone; and that the "stubbings" must be pretty serious, in order to have put their teacher in hospital indefinitely. 

A similar character, Anthony Crispino (played by Bobby Moynihan), made his first appearance on a Weekend Update in Season 35, and became a recurring character.

See also
 Recurring Saturday Night Live characters and sketches
 Mondegreen
 Floyd R. Turbo

References

External links
 Memorable Quotes from "Saturday Night Live" (1975)

Television characters introduced in 1975
Saturday Night Live characters
Fictional deaf characters
Female characters in television
Saturday Night Live in the 1970s